Jan Magiera (30 September 1938 – 9 February 2022) was a Polish cyclist. He competed at the 1964 Summer Olympics and the 1968 Summer Olympics.

He died in Mostki on 9 February 2022, at the age of 83.

References

External links
 

1938 births
2022 deaths
Polish male cyclists
Olympic cyclists of Poland
Cyclists at the 1964 Summer Olympics
Cyclists at the 1968 Summer Olympics
People from Nowy Sącz County
Sportspeople from Lesser Poland Voivodeship